Grimpoteuthis angularis is a species of octopus in the family Opisthoteuthidae. It was first described by Tristan J Verhoeff and Steve O'Shea in 2022, based on a single specimen found in New Zealand.

Taxonomy

The species was given the name angularis, referring to the octopus' angled shell. Verhoeff & O'Shea proposed that the common name of the species should be angle-shelled dumbo octopus. This species (as well as other Grimpoteuthis) may belong in its own family, the Grimpoteuthididae.

Description and habitat

The shell of Grimpoteuthis angularis is V-shaped, notably different to other Grimpoteuthis, the relatively elongate cirri are also distinctive. The holotype was discovered on the Chatham Rise to the east of New Zealand, at a depth of 628 metres.

References

Cephalopods of Oceania
Endemic fauna of New Zealand
Endemic molluscs of New Zealand
Fauna of the Chatham Islands
Molluscs described in 2022
Molluscs of New Zealand
Molluscs of the Pacific Ocean
Octopuses
Species known from a single specimen